The Solzhenitsyn Prize is a non-governmental Russian literary award established by the Russian writer Alexander Solzhenitsyn in 1997.

The $25,000 prize is awarded for "works in which troubles of the Russian life are shown with rare moral purity and sense of tragedy, for consecutiveness and steadiness in search of truth".  The prize is financed by royalties from sales of The Gulag Archipelago.

Laureates
1998 – Vladimir Toporov
1999 – Inna Lisnyanskaya
2000 – Valentin Rasputin
2001 – Konstantin Vorobyov (posthumous), Yevgeny Nosov
2002 – Aleksandr Panarin, Leonid Borodin
2003 – Olga Sedakova, Yuri Kublanovskij
2004 – Vladimir Bortko, Yevgeny Mironov
2005 – Igor Zolotussky
2006 – Alexei Varlamov
2007 – Sergei Bocharov, Andrey Zaliznyak
2008 – Boris Ekimov
2009 – Viktor Astafyev (posthumous)
2010 – Valentin Yanin
2011 – Yelena Chukovskaya
2012 – Oleg Pavlov
2013 – Maxim Amelin
2014 – Irina Rodnyanskaya
2015 – Sergey Zhenovach
2016 – Grigoriy Kruzhkov
2017 – Vladimir Enisherlov (:ru: Енишерлов, Владимир Петрович)
2018 – Sergey Lyubayev (:ru: Любаев, Сергей Викторович), Victor Britvin (:ru: Бритвин, Виктор Глебович) 
2019 – Eugene Vodolazkin
2020 – Natalya Mikhailova (:ru: Михайлова, Наталья Ивановна), Sergei Nekrasov

Notes

See also
 List of literary awards
 Prizes named after people

Russian literary awards
Russian-language literary awards
Aleksandr Solzhenitsyn